Evangelical bloc may refer to:
 The Evangelical part of the Christian right in various countries
 The Evangelical left